Peri Pourier is an American politician, serving as a member of the South Dakota House of Representatives from the 27th district since 2019, as a Democrat. Prior to entering politics, she worked as a background investigator.
As of 2022 her official profile listed her occupation as “small business owner”.
Pourier is a member of the Oglala tribal group and lives in Pine Ridge, South Dakota.

References 

Living people
Democratic Party members of the South Dakota House of Representatives
Women state legislators in South Dakota
Native American state legislators in South Dakota
People from Pine Ridge, South Dakota
Oglala people
Year of birth missing (living people)
21st-century American politicians
21st-century American women politicians
Native American women in politics
21st-century Native American women
21st-century Native Americans